101.7 Radyo Natin (DZVJ 101.7 MHz) is an FM station owned and operated by Manila Broadcasting Company. Its studios and transmitter are located at Maddela.

References

Radio stations established in 1997
Radio stations in Quirino
Radyo Natin Network stations